Footville may refer to:
Footville, North Carolina
Footville, Ohio
Footville, Wisconsin